The list of ship commissionings in 1979 includes a chronological list of all ships commissioned in 1979.


See also 

1979